The 2009 European Juveniles Baseball Championship was an international baseball competition held in Dupnitza and Blagoevgrad, Bulgaria from July 13 to 18, 2009. It featured teams from Austria, Bulgaria, Czech Republic, Lithuania, Romania, Russia, Slovakia, Turkey and Ukraine.

In the end the team from Czech Republic won the tournament with ease.

Group stage

Pool A

Standings

Game results

Pool B

Standings

Game results

Final round

Pool C

Standings

Game results

5th place

Semi-finals

3rd place

Final

Final standings

References

External links
Game Results

European Juveniles Baseball Championship
B
European Juveniles Baseball Championship
Baseball in Europe
2009 in Bulgarian sport